Albert Butler is a politician.

Albert Butler may also refer to:

A T Butler, an English architect
Albert Victor (Ben) Butler, a professional footballer for Reading and Queens Park Rangers

See also
Bert Butler (disambiguation)